Capua aridela is a species of moth of the family Tortricidae. It is found in Australia, where it has been recorded from Norfolk Island.

The wingspan is about 21 mm. The forewings are silvery-white with scanty  grey irroration (speckling) and sparsely scattered pale-ochreous scales and black markings. The hindwings are whitish-grey, but somewhat darker towards the apex.

References

Moths described in 1918
Capua (moth)